The Islamic Republic of Iran Broadcasting (IRIB) media corporation operates a range of nationwide and provincial television channels in Iran, and also broadcasts to other countries.

Domestic channels 

IRIB TV1 (Iranian's Channel)
IRIB TV2 (Life Channel)
IRIB TV3 (Youth Channel)
IRIB TV4 (Educated People's Channel)
IRIB TV5/Tehran TV (Local Tehran Channel)
IRINN (News Channel)
IRIB Amoozesh (Education Channel)
IRIB Quran (Religion and Life Channel)
IRIB Mostanad (Documentary Channel)
IRIB Namayesh (Movie and TV Series Channel)
IRIB Varzesh (Sports Channel)
IRIB Pooya & Nahal (Young Children Channel)
IRIB Salamat (Health and Fun Channel)
IRIB Tamasha (TV Series Channel)
IRIB Nasim (Fun and Entertainment Channel)
IRIB Ofogh (Cultural, Artistic and Social Channel)
IRIB Omid (Teenager Channel)
iFilm (Entertainment Channel in Persian Language)
IRIB UHD-HDR (4K Channel)

Foreign channels 
iFilm (Entertainment network consisting of three channels in English, Arabic and Dari languages)
Jame Jam TV, Jame Jam 2, Jame Jam 3 (Targeted to European, American and Asian/Oceanian audiences)
Sahar TV (Multiple languages)
Al-Kawthar TV (Arabic Channel)
Al-Alam News Network (Arabic Language News Channel) 
Press TV (English and French Language News Channel) 
HispanTV (Spanish Language News Channel)
IranPress (Video news agency)

Provincial channels 

IRIB Sahand TV
IRIB Azerbaijan TV
IRIB Sabalan TV
IRIB Eshragh TV
IRIB Alborz TV
IRIB Aflak TV
IRIB Aftab TV
IRIB Baran TV
IRIB Bushehr TV
IRIB Dena TV
IRIB Esfahan TV
IRIB Fars TV
IRIB Sabz TV
IRIB Hamoon TV
IRIB Ilam TV
IRIB Jahanbin TV
IRIB Kerman TV
IRIB Zagros TV
IRIB Khalije Fars TV
IRIB Khoozestan TV
IRIB Khavaran TV
IRIB Khorasan Razavi TV
IRIB Atrak TV
IRIB Kordestan TV
IRIB Noor TV
IRIB Qazvin TV
IRIB Semnan TV
IRIB Hamedan TV
IRIB Taban TV
IRIB Tabarestan TV
IRIB Abadan TV
IRIB Mahabad TV
IRIB Kish TV

Closed and merged channels 
IRIB Bazaar
IRIB HD
IRIB Tehran
IRIB Shoma (Cultural Channel)
IRIB Iran Kala (Iran Goods Channel)

References